Phillip Mackenzie is a British musician and a graduate of Oxford University. He is the founder of the Amadeus Orchestra, a British orchestra dedicated to young musicians, and is the musical director of the London Mozart Symphony Orchestra.

References

External links
London Mozart Symphony Orchestra website
Amadeus Orchestra website

Alumni of the University of Oxford
Year of birth missing (living people)
Living people
British male conductors (music)
Music directors
21st-century British conductors (music)
21st-century British male musicians